Maesycwmmer is a village and community in the centre of Caerphilly County Borough in Wales, within the historic boundaries of Monmouthshire.

Location 
It is a community in Caerphilly County Borough.

History & amenities 

Maesycwmmer is still overshadowed by the vast Maesycwmmer (or Hengoed) Viaduct, which dates from 1853 and which carried the Taff Vale Extension of the Newport, Abergavenny and Hereford Railway over the Rhymney valley. In 2000 the viaduct was re-opened for public pedestrian access.

Today the village features the "Wheel o Drams" (locally known as "The Stargate") sculpture by Andy Hazell, an unusual piece of modern art formed from a circle of coalmining dram trucks to commemorate the industrial heritage of this locality within the history of the South Wales Valleys. The village shared three railway stations with neighbouring Hengoed over the years (see Hengoed railway station).

There are two pubs in Maesycwmmer: The Maesycwmmer Inn and The Angel (a third, The Butchers Arms, became an Indian restaurant called The Spice Tree).

Maesycwmmer was a creation of the Industrial Revolution in the South Wales Coalfield. The houses built along the main road were purpose built for the workers that built the Maesycwmmer to Hengoed Viaduct. There is also a disused quarry in a field behind the houses of St Annes Gardens.

Maesycwmmer has both a junior and a senior football team. The senior team, Maesycwmmer FC, was founded in 2010 and plays in the North Gwent Football League. Matches are played at The Bryn, just outside Maesycwmmer. The Angel pub, which the team used for its post match entertainment, is the main club sponsor.

Filming location
Maesycwmmer is actor-director Craig Roberts's hometown. Roberts finished filming locally in August 2014 for the movie Just Jim, which is inspired by his early life in Maesycwmmer and was released in 2015.

The first series of the S4C drama 35 Diwrnod (2014) was filmed in Maesycwmmer.

Notable people
As well as Craig Roberts, Maesycwmmer was the birthplace of educationalist Mary Bridges-Adams (née Daltry) in 1854.

Sports
Maesycwmmer Football Club (2010)

References

External links
Old photo of the viaduct in 1952
Genuki on Maesycwmmer

Maesycwmmer
Communities in Caerphilly County Borough